Phloeipsius fraudator is a species of beetle in the family Laemophloeidae, the only species in the genus Phloeipsius.

References

Laemophloeidae
Beetles described in 1899